The Mammoth Book of Best New Horror is an anthology series published annually by Constable & Robinson since 1990. In addition to the short stories, each edition includes a retrospective essay by the editors. The first six anthologies were originally published under the name Best New Horror before the title was changed beginning with the seventh book.

The first five books in the series were edited by Stephen Jones and Ramsey Campbell; beginning with the sixth book in 1995 they have been edited solely by Stephen Jones.

Volumes
 Best New Horror - 1990
 Best New Horror 2 - 1991
 Best New Horror 3 - 1992
 Best New Horror 4 - 1993
 Best New Horror 5 - 1994
 Best New Horror 6 - 1995
 The Mammoth Book of Best New Horror 7 - 1996
 The Mammoth Book of Best New Horror 8 - 1997
 The Mammoth Book of Best New Horror 9 - 1998
 The Mammoth Book of Best New Horror 10 - 1999
 The Mammoth Book of Best New Horror 11 - 2000
 The Mammoth Book of Best New Horror 12 - 2001
 The Mammoth Book of Best New Horror 13 - 2002
 The Mammoth Book of Best New Horror 14 - 2003
 The Mammoth Book of Best New Horror 15 - 2004
 The Mammoth Book of Best New Horror 16 - 2005
 The Mammoth Book of Best New Horror 17 - 2006
 The Mammoth Book of Best New Horror 18 - 2007
 The Mammoth Book of Best New Horror 19 - 2008
 The Mammoth Book of Best New Horror 20 - 2009
 The Mammoth Book of Best New Horror 21 - 2010
 The Mammoth Book of Best New Horror 22 - 2011
 The Mammoth Book of Best New Horror 23 - 2012
 The Mammoth Book of Best New Horror 24 - 2013
 The Mammoth Book of Best New Horror 25 - 2014
 The Mammoth Book of Best New Horror 26 - 2015
 The Mammoth Book of Best New Horror 27 - 2017
 The Mammoth Book of Best New Horror 28 - 2018
 The Mammoth Book of Best New Horror 29 - 2019
 The Mammoth Book of Best New Horror 30 - 2020
 The Mammoth Book of Best New Horror 31 - 2021

Reception
Gideon Kibblewhite reviewed the 1994 volume of The Best New Horror for Arcane magazine, rating it a 9 out of 10 overall. Kibblewhite comments that "Drawing on the great variety of horror writing, from psychological suspense to magical realism, this collection also provides an excellent opportunity to become acquainted with some of the great authors of the field."

Books from the anthology series have been nominated for the World Fantasy Award for Best Anthology. The first book in the series won the 1991 award, and the twelfth volume was nominated for the 2002 award.

References 

Fantasy anthology series
Fantasy books by series
Horror anthologies
1990 anthologies